Stefano Usodimare  (died 1557) was the Master of the Order of Preachers from 1553 to 1557.

Biography

Usodimare was from Genoa, the son of a Spanish family.  At the Dominican chapter of 1553, he was the preferred candidate of Pope Julius III, and was elected master.  Pope Paul IV made him a cardinal in 1557.  He died later in 1557.

References

1557 deaths
16th-century Genoese people
16th-century Italian Christian monks
16th-century Italian cardinals
Italian Dominicans
Masters of the Order of Preachers
Italian people of Spanish descent
Year of birth unknown